Festival Miami was a music festival series hosted by the University of Miami's Frost School of Music annually in October from 1984 through 2017. In 2017, the festival was integrated with ongoing live music events hosted by the University of Miami throughout the year. 

Festival Miami offered a wide range of musical programming, including Latin, jazz, classical, and creative American music.

Past performers
Past performers have included University of Miami alumni Gloria Estefan, Ben Folds, Bruce Hornsby, and Jon Secada. 

Other past performers have included Joshua Bell, Jackson Browne, Willy Chirino, Shawn Colvin, Edgar Meyer, and others.

References

External links
Official website

Jazz festivals in the United States
Music festivals in Miami
Tourist attractions in Miami-Dade County, Florida
Music festivals established in 1984
University of Miami
Classical music festivals in the United States
1984 establishments in Florida